The Lowndes County School District is a public school district based in Lowndes County, Mississippi (United States).

The district serves the towns of Caledonia, Crawford, and Artesia, the community of New Hope, and most rural areas in Lowndes County.

Schools

High Schools (Grades 912)
Caledonia High School
New Hope High School
West Lowndes High School

Middle Schools (Grades 68)
Caledonia Middle School
New Hope Middle School
West Lowndes Middle School

Elementary Schools (Grades K5)
Caledonia Elementary School
New Hope Elementary School (split into two buildings: K2 and 35)
West Lowndes Elementary School

Demographics

200607 school year
There were a total of 5,502 students enrolled in the Lowndes County School District during the 20062007 school year. The gender makeup of the district was 49% female and 51% male. The racial makeup of the district was 38.99% African American, 59.52% White, 0.91% Hispanic, 0.47% Asian, and 0.11% Native American. 44.0% of the district's students were eligible to receive free lunch.

Previous school years

Accountability statistics

See also
List of school districts in Mississippi

References

External links

Education in Lowndes County, Mississippi
School districts in Mississippi